Pakistan competed at the 2020 Winter Youth Olympics in Lausanne, Switzerland from 9 to 22 January 2020.

Pakistan made it Winter Youth Olympics debut.

Alpine skiing

Girls

See also
Pakistan at the 2020 Summer Olympics

References

2020 in Pakistani sport
Nations at the 2020 Winter Youth Olympics
Pakistan at the Youth Olympics